Canadian Rugby Union may refer to:

Football Canada, the governing body of amateur Canadian football in Canada, previously known as the Canadian Rugby Union from 1892 to 1967.  
Rugby Canada, which has governed rugby union in Canada since its incorporation in 1974.